The 1886 Flintshire by-election was a parliamentary by-election held for the House of Commons constituency of Flintshire in Wales on 2 March 1886.

Vacancy
The by-election was caused by the resignation of the sitting Liberal MP, Richard Grosvenor who was appointed a Steward of the Chiltern Hundreds and then to the House of Lords.

Candidates
Two candidates nominated.

The Liberal Party nominated businessman Samuel Smith.

The Conservative Party nominated Justice of the Peace Philip Pennant Pennant.

Results

References

1886 elections in the United Kingdom
By-elections to the Parliament of the United Kingdom in Welsh constituencies
1886 in Wales
1880s elections in Wales
March 1886 events
History of Flintshire